is a Japanese-British classical pianist and conductor, born in Japan and naturalised in Britain, particularly noted for her interpretations of Mozart and Schubert.

She has appeared with many notable orchestras, recorded a wide repertory with several labels, won numerous awards and honours (including Dame Commander of the Order of the British Empire in 2009) and is the Co-Artistic Director, with Jonathan Biss, of the Marlboro Music School and Festival. She has also conducted several major orchestras.

Career
Born in Atami, a seaside town close to Tokyo, Japan, Uchida moved to Vienna, Austria, with her diplomat parents when she was 12 years old, after her father was named the Japanese ambassador to Austria. She enrolled at the Vienna Academy of Music to study with Richard Hauser and later Wilhelm Kempff and Stefan Askenase and remained in Vienna to study when her father was transferred back to Japan after five years. She gave her first Viennese recital at the age of 14 at the Vienna Musikverein. She also studied with Maria Curcio, the last and favourite pupil of Artur Schnabel.

She was awarded tenth prize at the Queen Elisabeth Music Competition in 1968, playing Beethoven, Debussy, and Brenta in the finals. In 1969 Uchida won the first prize in the Beethoven Competition in Vienna and in 1970 the second prize in the VIII International Chopin Piano Competition. In 1975, she won second prize in the Leeds Piano Competition.

In 1998 Uchida was the Music Director of the Ojai Music Festival in conjunction with conductor and violinist, David Zinman.

She is an acclaimed interpreter of the works of Mozart, Beethoven, Schubert, Chopin, Debussy and Schoenberg. She has recorded all of Mozart's piano sonatas (a project that won the Gramophone Award in 1989) and concerti, the latter with the English Chamber Orchestra, conducted by Jeffrey Tate. Her recording of the Schoenberg Piano Concerto with Pierre Boulez won another Gramophone Award. Uchida is further noted for her recordings of Beethoven's complete piano concerti with Kurt Sanderling conducting, Beethoven's late piano sonatas, and a Schubert piano cycle. She is also respected as a distinguished interpreter of the works of the Second Viennese School. 

Her 2009 recording of the Mozart piano concertos nos. 23 and 24, in which she conducted the Cleveland Orchestra as well as playing the solo part, won the Grammy Award in 2011. This recording was the start of a project to record all the Mozart piano concertos for a second time, conducting the Cleveland Orchestra from the piano. Further recordings for this project were released in 2011, 2012 and 2014.

From 2002 to 2007 she was artist-in-residence for the Cleveland Orchestra, where she led performances of all Mozart's solo piano concertos. She has also conducted the English Chamber Orchestra, from the keyboard. In 2010, she was artist-in-residence for the Berlin Philharmonic. She was senior artist at the Marlboro Music School and Festival in 1974 and 1992, and has been permanently associated with Marlboro since 1994 when she became a member of the Committee for Artistic Direction. In 1999 she became one of two Artistic Directors along with fellow pianist Richard Goode. She served as the sole Director until 2018 when Marlboro Music announced that American pianist Jonathan Biss would assume the role of co-artistic director. She is also a founding trustee of the Borletti-Buitoni Trust, an organisation established to help young artists develop and sustain international careers. In May 2012, the Royal Philharmonic Society announced that she would be honoured with their Gold Medal (she received the society's annual Music Award in 2003); previous recipients have included Johannes Brahms (1877), Frederick Delius and Sir Edward Elgar (1925), Richard Strauss (1936), Igor Stravinsky (1954), Benjamin Britten and Leonard Bernstein (1987).

Her 2015 performance with the Cleveland Orchestra elicited this review from the Cleveland Plain Dealer:

Her 2022 recording of Beethoven's Diabelli Variations was nominated for a Grammy for Best Classical Instrumental Solo and won a Gramophone Piano Award.

Honours and awards
1986: Suntory Music Award
1989: Gramophone Award for Best Instrumental Recording, for her set of the complete Piano Sonatas of Wolfgang Amadeus Mozart
2001: Appointed Honorary Commander of the Order of the British Empire (CBE) in the 2001 New Year Honours. At the time, the award was honorary because she was not yet a citizen of the United Kingdom.
2001: Gramophone Award for Best Concerto Recording, for her recording of the piano concerto of Arnold Schoenberg (with Pierre Boulez conducting)
2003: Uchida was elected an international member of the American Philosophical Society
2008: In April, BBC Music Magazine presented her its awards for Instrumentalist of the Year, and Disc of the Year (Beethoven's Hammerklavier Sonata).
2009: She was promoted to Dame Commander of the Order of the British Empire (DBE) in the 2009 Queen's Birthday Honours. On this occasion, the award was substantive, as she had become a British citizen.
2009: In June, she was awarded an honorary Doctor of Music (DMus) degree by the University of Oxford during Encaenia 2009.
2011: Grammy award for Best Instrumental Soloist(s) Performance (with orchestra) for her recording of Mozart's Piano Concerti No. 23 K. 488 and No. 24 K. 491 with the Cleveland Orchestra, which she conducted from the keyboard.
2012: in May, Uchida was awarded the Royal Philharmonic Society Gold Medal, one of the highest honours in classical music.
2015: in January, Uchida was awarded the Gold Medal of the Foundation (Stiftung) of the Mozarteum University of Salzburg
 2015: Praemium Imperiale, awarded by the imperial family of Japan
 2017: Grammy Award for the Best Classical Solo Vocal Album (as accompanist) with Dorothea Röschmann

References

External links

Borletti-Buitoni Trust
, WNCN-FM, 1 December 1985

Erica Jeal, 'Musical moments' (profile of Mitsuko Uchida), The Guardian, 25 February 2006. Accessed 1 February 2008.
Allan Kozinn, 'A Keyboard Alchemist Exploring the Haze', New York Times, 29 April 2005. Accessed 1 February 2008.
Transcript: 'Mitsuko Uchida', The Music Show, ABC (Australia), 1 July 2006. Accessed 1 February 2008.
Andrew Lindemann Malone, 'From Pianist Uchida, Daring, Intense Mozart', The Washington Post, 17 November 2005, Page C02. Accessed 1 February 2008.

1948 births
Dames Commander of the Order of the British Empire
Japanese classical pianists
Japanese women pianists
Women classical pianists
Japanese expatriates in Austria
Japanese expatriates in England
Living people
Musicians from Vienna
Musicians from Shizuoka Prefecture
Prize-winners of the International Chopin Piano Competition
Prize-winners of the Leeds International Pianoforte Competition
Pupils of Maria Curcio
University of Music and Performing Arts Vienna alumni
Honorary Members of the Royal Academy of Music
Musicians from London
Royal Philharmonic Society Gold Medallists
Recipients of the Praemium Imperiale
Persons of Cultural Merit
Naturalised citizens of the United Kingdom
Musicians awarded knighthoods
20th-century classical pianists
Members of the American Philosophical Society
Prize-winners of the ARD International Music Competition